(1928 – 24 December 2019) was a Japanese photographer best known for her 1957 book of text and photographs Kiken na Adabana, and particularly for its portrayal of the red-light district of post-occupation Yokohama, with US servicemen.

Life and career
Toyoko Tokiwa was born in Yokohama in 1928. (As a photographer, she would later spell "toyo" in hiragana rather than the original katakana.) Her family ran a liquor wholesaler at Kanagawa-dōri 4-chōme in Kanagawa-ku, Yokohama, where she lived until the building was burnt down in the American firebombing of 29 May 1945, an event in which her father sustained fatal burns. Her elder brother had used a Rolleicord camera and a darkroom, and this combined with a desire to work among men led Tokiwa to want to work as a photographer, even before she had used a camera herself.

Tokiwa graduated from Tokyo Kasei-Gakuin (the predecessor of Tokyo Kasei-Gakuin Junior College) in 1951. She started work as an announcer but dreamt of being a photographer instead, joining the women-only Shirayuri Camera Club (Shirayuri Kamera Kurabu); she was influenced by the realism of Japanese photography at the time (led by Ken Domon).

Some of Tokiwa's earliest photographs are of Ōsanbashi, the pier in Yokohama at which American ships docked and that was thus the site of emotional partings and reunions of American military families. She was able to photograph close up without attracting any comment, and greatly enjoyed the work. But she quickly moved to her main interest, working women. Despite an initial hatred of the American military, prompted in particular by her father's death, and revulsion at prostitution, she simply invited herself into the akasen (red-light area) of Yokohama, asked the girls whether she might photograph, and was accepted.

Tokiwa would later marry an amateur photographer,  (1914–1995) – whose photography of postwar Japan appears with hers in a 1996 book – and work as both housewife and photojournalist.

She was a member of the Japan Professional Photographers Society and chaired the Kanagawa Prefectural Photographers Association (Kanagawa-ken shashin-sakka kyōkai).

Kiken na Adabana

In 1956 Tokiwa held an exhibition titled Hataraku Josei (Working women) at the Konishiroku Photo Gallery (Tokyo) that won high acclaim. The exhibition showed pro wrestlers, models, ama, nurses and prostitutes.

In 1957, her book Kiken na Adabana (literally "Dangerous toxic/fruitless flowers"), was published by Mikasa Shobō. Its text is divided into three parts:

Kiken na adabana (as explained above)
Fāsutofurekkusu kara Kyanon made (i.e. "From Firstflex to Canon"; the Firstflex was a brand of twin-lens reflex camera made by Tokiwa Seiki)
Kōfuku e no iriguchi no aru ie (i.e. "A house with an entrance to happiness")

Each of these is further subdivided into short essays. The text is in the first person and often about Tokiwa herself: the (composite) cover photograph and the photograph in the frontispiece both show Tokiwa holding a Canon rangefinder camera, in a period when photography was very much a male pursuit in Japan.

The text of the book is interrupted by four sections of photographs, taken between 1952 and 1957 (captions and technical data appear on pp. 242–241). There is a title on the first photograph of each; these are:

Aru machi no kurai onna no iru fūkei (i.e. "The dark scenery with women of a certain Japanese town"). Mostly street scenes within this town (Yokohama) many showing girls and US servicemen. On pp. 44–45 appears Tokiwa's most famous photograph, taken in Wakaba-chō Bā-gai (bar street), behind Isezakichō, showing a girl held down by a foreign man while another in uniform looks away.
Kiken na hakimono (i.e. "Dangerous footwear"). The opening photograph shows geta and sandals discarded at the entrance to a hospital; the photographs that follow show girls waiting for or having injections and mandatory checks of freedom from venereal diseases.
Fāsutofurekkusu kara Kyanon made (as explained above). A complex series: foreign visitors to Japan, ama, nude modelling, and chindon'ya.
Kōfuku e no iriguchi no aru ie (as explained above). Happier scenes of young women – although the series ends with the scene shown within the lens on the cover.

Kōtarō Iizawa calls the book "the strongest, most compassionate work by female photographer of that era."

Television work
From 1962 to 1965 Tokiwa produced the television series Hataraku Josei-tachi (Working women).

Other photography and publications
Tokiwa photographed around US military bases in Yokosuka (1958) and the Ryūkyū islands (1960), the Soviet Union (1974, and Taiwan and Malaysia (1975–80). Since 1985, she worked on issues involving the elderly.

In November 2010, when she spoke (on the 23rd) to the Japan Professional Photographers Society's 60th anniversary photo exhibition "Women" in Yokohama to an audience of about a hundred on her early days as a photographer, she was living in Yokohama and working on photographing people with Alzheimer's disease.

Other work
In 1967 Tokiwa joined a committee choosing work for exhibition by Kanagawa Prefecture, and in 1987 she taught at Fujisawa Bunka Sentā (Fujisawa, Kanagawa).

Exhibitions
In 1957, Tokiwa joined Tōmatsu, Narahara and others in the first exhibition of Jūnin no Me (The Eyes of Ten). Until 1960, Tokiwa presented her work in several exhibitions, at least once together with Hisae Imai.

The 3rd Month of Photography Tokyo showcased a variety of photograph exhibitions at various galleries in Tokyo in 1998. The main theme was "The Eye of Women Photographers" (Josei Shashinka no Manazashi), and it exhibited photographs by Tokiwa and other established Japanese women photographers of the 1945–1997 period.

Tokiwa joined the Yokohama Photo Triangle exhibition in 2009, held as a part of the 150th anniversary of the opening of the port of Yokohama, where she also organized a civic participation program.

Permanent collections
Tokyo Metropolitan Museum of Photography.
Yamaguchi Prefectural Museum of Art.
Yokohama Civic Art Gallery.

Books by Tokiwa
Kiken na Adabana. Tokyo: Mikasa Shobō, 1957. 
With Taikō Okumura. Sengo 50-nen: Yokohama Saigen: Futari de Utsushita Haisen Sutōrī. Tokyo: Heibonsha, 1996. .  Photographs of Yokohama after the war; pp. 3–95 show Okumura's work, pp. 96–143 show Tokiwa's.
Watashi no naka no Yokohama Densetsu: Tokiwa Toyoko Shashinshū 1954–1956 / A Collection of Photographs by Toyoko Tokiwa. Yokohama: Tokiwa Toyoko Shashin Jimusho, 2001.  Photographs of Yokohama, 1954–56.

Further reading
Iizawa Kōtarō. Shashin to Kotoba: Shashinka Nijūgo-nin, Kaku Katariki. Shūeisha Shinsho. Tokyo: Shūeisha, 2003. . Pages 91–97 are devoted to Tokiwa.
Matsumoto Norihiko. "Gun-kichi-mondai ni idomu: Saeki Yoshikatsu to Tokiwa Toyoko". Pp. 35–40 of Shōwa o Toraeta Shashinka no Me: Sengo-Shashin no Ayumi o Tadoru. Tokyo: Asahi Shinbunsha, 1989. .

Notes

References

1928 births
2019 deaths
Japanese photographers
Japanese essayists
People from Yokohama
Japanese women photographers
Street photographers